The Good Life is an American sitcom that was aired on NBC as part of its 1971–1972 lineup. The series stars Larry Hagman and Donna Mills, and was produced by Lorimar, in association with Screen Gems.

Synopsis
The Good Life is the story of a middle class American couple, the Millers (Hagman and Mills), who have tired of their mundane existence. Instead of following the time-honored premise of "hitting the road" to seek adventure or engaging in a stereotypical period activity such as joining a communal farm, they just decide to seek new employment as the live-in butler and cook of a millionaire industrialist, Charles Dutton. He notices that they are not particularly talented at their jobs, but finds them to be agreeable enough. Their limited skills most definitely are not enough for his stuffy sister Grace, however, and she constantly works to get them fired. Dutton's teenaged son, Nick, is the only one aware of what the Millers are doing in their new roles, but, finding great fun in their situation, he helps them to become accustomed to the social etiquette of high society and the wealthy in an effort to improve their skills in their roles.

The theme song was the 1962 pop song The Good Life, written by Sacha Distel and Jack Reardon, and sung under the titles by Tony Orlando.

This program did not garner much of an audience and it was cancelled at mid-season. It was replaced by the action drama, Emergency!.

A decade later, Hagman and Mills were reunited onscreen when he guest-starred on Knots Landing, on which Mills had become a series regular in 1980. Being a spin-off from Dallas, Knots Landing featured Hagman in the role of J. R. Ewing, who was often in cahoots with Mills' character Abby Cunningham. Both series were also Lorimar productions. 
David Wayne would also reunite with Hagman on Dallas, where he originated the role of Willard "Digger" Barnes.

The British television series The Good Life was released as Good Neighbors in American syndication to avoid confusion with this earlier series.

Cast 
 Larry Hagman as Albert Miller
 Donna Mills as Jane Miller
 David Wayne as Charles Dutton
 Hermione Baddeley as Grace Dutton
 Danny Goldman as Nick Dutton

Episodes

References 
 Brooks, Tim and Marsh, Earle, The Complete Directory to Prime Time Network and Cable TV Shows 1946–Present
 Wallop, Douglass, The Good Life (1969 novel on which the TV series was based)

External links 
 
The Good Life at Television Obscurities

1971 American television series debuts
1972 American television series endings
1970s American sitcoms
English-language television shows
NBC original programming
Television series by Sony Pictures Television
Television shows based on books
Television series by Lorimar Television
Television series by Screen Gems